This is a list of all reptiles living in Spain, both in the Iberian Peninsula and other territories such as Ceuta, Melilla, the Balearic Islands and the Canary Islands (including marine reptiles that can be found on its shores). Both native and introduced species are included.

Order Testudines

Family Testudinidae

Family Emydidae

Family Geoemydidae

Family Dermochelyidae

Family Cheloniidae

Order Squamata

Family Chamaeleonidae

Family Blanidae

Family Agamidae

Family Anguidae

Gekkota (families Gekkonidae, Sphaerodactylidae, Phyllodactylidae)

Family Scincidae

Family Lacertidae

Family Trogonophidae

Serpentes

Family Colubridae

Family Viperidae

Notes

References

External links 

 
Reptiles
Spain